Robert J. Woodhead is an entrepreneur, software engineer and former game programmer.  He claims that a common thread in his career is "doing weird things with computers".

Career 
In 1979 he co-founded Sirotech (later known as Sir-Tech) with Norman Sirotek and Robert Sirotek. Along with Andrew C. Greenberg, he created the Apple II game Wizardry: Proving Grounds of the Mad Overlord, one of the first role-playing video games written for a personal computer, as well as several of its sequels. Woodhead designed the 1982 Apple II arcade game Star Maze, which was programmed by Gordon Eastman and sold through Sir-Tech. He told TODAY magazine in 1983, "I have loads of arcade game ideas, but lack the patience to do the actual coding. I'm sort of a big project person; I like the challenge of a program like Wizardry."

Later, he authored Interferon and Virex, two of the earliest anti-virus applications for the Macintosh, and co-founded AnimEigo, one of the first US anime releasing companies. As a result of this venture, while living in Japan, he married his translator and interpreter, Natsumi Ueki, together with whom he has two children.  He also runs a search engine promotion website called SelfPromotion.com.

As a hobby, he builds combat robots, and his children, James Ueki and Alex Ueki, are the 2004 and 2005 Robot Fighting League National Champions in the 30 lb Featherweight class.

Woodhead made a cameo appearance in the 1982 video game Ultima II as an NPC; when the player talked to him he would scream "Copy Protect!", a sarcastic reference to the extensive copy protection methods used in video games of the time.  He also has a screen credit in the film Real Genius as their "Hacking Consultant".

Woodhead has created two successful Kickstarter projects, "Bubblegum Crisis Ultimate Edition Blu-Ray Set" ($153,964 pledged on a $75,000 goal), and "BackerSupport" ($326 pledged on a $100 goal).

Woodhead has also served on the Eve Online Council of Stellar Management with an in-game avatar name of Trebor Daehdoow. He was re-elected for 4 terms, serving in his last term as Chairman.

References

External links
 Animeigo homepage
 Family website
 Campaign page for CSM 7 election
 Robert Woodhead at Twitter
 Robert Woodhead at MobyGames
 Candidacy post for CSM 7 elections
 Eve Online Profile page for Trebor Daehdoow
 Eve Online Blog
 Audio interview for the CSM 8 election campaign

20th-century American businesspeople
American businesspeople in retailing
American video game designers
American video game programmers
Anime industry
Computer programmers
Cornell University alumni
Living people
Year of birth missing (living people)